Javier Gómez Fuertes (born 5 December 1986) is a Spanish gymnast. He finished 23rd in the all around at the 2012 Summer Olympics.

References

External links
 

1986 births
Living people
Spanish male artistic gymnasts
Olympic gymnasts of Spain
Gymnasts at the 2012 Summer Olympics
Gymnasts from Barcelona